21st Century Live is a live album by the band Styx released in 2003.  The album contains a CD and a DVD.

The tracks on the CD are identical to the tracks released on Styx World: Live 2001 (2001), but are presented in a different order and do not include some tracks included on Styx World: Live 2001. The DVD contains songs from Styx World: Live 2001 and two other previously released albums, Arch Allies: Live at Riverport (2001) and At the River's Edge: Live in St. Louis (2002), which contain songs recorded by Styx at a live performance in St. Louis, Missouri on June 9, 2000. The DVD contains two previously unreleased live recordings from that show, "Kiss Your Ass Goodbye" and "These Are the Times".

Track listing

CD tracks

DVD tracks

Personnel
Tommy Shaw: Vocals, Electric & Acoustic Guitar, Mandolin
James "J.Y." Young: Vocals, Electric & Acoustic Guitar, Keyboards
Lawrence Gowan: Vocals, Keyboards
Glen Burtnik: Vocals, Bass, Electric Guitar
Chuck Panozzo: Bass
Todd Sucherman: Drums

2003 live albums
Styx (band) live albums
2003 video albums
Live video albums
Styx (band) video albums
Sanctuary Records live albums
Sanctuary Records video albums